Euric Allan Bobb (born 31 October 1943) is an economist and former athlete from Trinidad and Tobago.

Athletics
As an athlete he specialized in the 400 metres. He finished sixth in the 4 × 400 metres relay at the 1968 Summer Olympics, together with teammates Benedict Cayenne, Edwin Roberts and George Simon.

Career
Bobb was born in Trinidad and obtained a degree in economics from the University of Cambridge in England. After retiring from athletics he was appointed as the Governor of the Central Bank of Trinidad and Tobago from 1984 to 1988. In 1994, he was awarded the Trinidad & Tobago Chaconia Gold Medal for outstanding public service.

References

1943 births
Living people
Trinidad and Tobago male sprinters
Athletes (track and field) at the 1968 Summer Olympics
Olympic athletes of Trinidad and Tobago
Alumni of the University of Cambridge
Trinidad and Tobago economists
Governors of the Central Bank of Trinidad and Tobago